Marefield Junction was a railway junction in Marefield, Leicestershire, England. There was never a station at this location, but just to the north was John O' Gaunt railway station; just to the south was Tilton railway station, and just to the west was Lowesby railway station. The viaduct close to the junction still exists although the line has been closed for nearly 50 years.

References

Rail transport in Leicestershire
London and North Western Railway
Great Northern Railway (Great Britain)
Rail junctions in England